Tianfu New Area was officially launched in December 2011. The establishment of Chengdu Tianfu New Area aims at reconstructing a modern international urban area suitable for residence, industry and commerce. It focuses on modern manufacturing industry and high-end service clusters. The planning scope of Tianfu New Area includes the southern part of Chengdu High-tech Zone, Longquanyi District, Shuangliu County, Xinjin County, Jianyang City, Pengshan County of Meishan City and Renshou County. It involves in total 3 cities, 7 counties (city, district) and 37 towns and villages. The total area is planned to cover 1,578 square kilometres.

It is understood that the first 84 projects of Chengdu Tianfu New Area include 51 industry projects with the investment of 169.5 billion RMB (including 27 industrial projects with an investment of 82.35 billion RMB and 24 service projects with an investment of 87.15 billion RMB), 29 infrastructure projects with an investment of 43.4 billion RMB, and 4 ecology projects with an investment of 1.5 billion RMB.

Major projects in the Tianfu New Area include the construction of the New Century Global Centre (complete), Chengdu Tianfu International Airport and the Chengdu Contemporary Arts Centre. Another major project is the 900-acre (5,463 mu) Meishan California Smart City (MCSC) development, which is focused on renewable energy, energy generation, distribution, storage, testing, inspection, and certification, and new technologies.

The first Legoland Themepark in China will be located in Meishan.

References

2011 establishments in China
Economy of Chengdu
Geography of Chengdu
New areas (China)